Nicolò Longobardo (1559-1654), Chinese name Long Huamin, was a Sicilian Jesuit in China in the 17th century. He arrived there in 1597, and was sent to the area of Shaozhou. He became the successor of Matteo Ricci in 1610 as Superior General of the Jesuit China mission.

He was replaced as Superior by Giovanni Aroccia in 1622, but continued preaching in China until around 90 years of age.

The Jesuit's name also appears in historical sources as Nicholas Longobardi and Niccolo Longobardi, with the birth and death years given as 1565–1655.

He was buried in the Jesuits' Zhalan Cemetery in Beijing.

References

1559 births
1654 deaths
16th-century Italian Jesuits
17th-century Italian Jesuits
Jesuit missionaries in China
Italian Roman Catholic missionaries
Jesuit missionaries
Roman Catholic missionaries in China
Italian emigrants to China